Gazi Salahuddin (born 8 November 1984) is a first class and list a cricketer from Bangladesh. He made his first class debut for Chittagong Division in the 2003/04 season. He also represented Bangladesh A in 2006/07. He has recorded 4 first class centuries and 13 fifties, with a fine knock of 165 against Barisal Division

See also
 List of Chittagong Division cricketers

References

Bangladeshi cricketers
Chittagong Division cricketers
Living people
People from Brahmanbaria district
1984 births